The Battle of Tarentum in March 212 BC was a military engagement in the Second Punic War.

Prelude
The Romans had been waiting for a chance to strike at Capua, the capital of Campania in southern Italy, after it revolted against them following their defeat by the Carthaginian Hannibal at Cannae in 216 BC. Hannibal had made the city his winter headquarters, and his proximity deterred the Romans.  In 212 BC, however, Hannibal was called south to Tarentum, giving the Romans a chance to strike. Hannibal hoped for a success big enough to risk the loss of Capua. His eyes had long been set on the city of Tarentum, the richest in the whole of southern Italy.

Tarentum's dislike of Rome
Hannibal had been in communication with a party of Tarentine citizens who were unhappy with Roman rule. A previous attempt had been made by the people of Tarentum to rid themselves of the Romans. However, it was thwarted by the precautions that the Roman commander of Brundisium had taken. He took effectual means for the defence of the city and sent some of the possible malcontents to Rome to serve as hostages for the good behaviour of the rest of the population. These hostages were later caught trying to escape, several of whom were then convicted by the quaestores parricidii and sentenced to be flung from the Tarpeian Rock. This act infuriated the people of Tarentum, who renewed their communications with Hannibal.

Hannibal's assault
Marcus Livius, the governor general of the city, was a good soldier but is said to be a man of indolent and luxurious habits. On the night appointed by Hannibal for the attack he was feasting with friends and retired to rest, heavy with food and wine. In the middle of the night he was awakened when the conspirators blew the alarm on some Roman trumpets and found Hannibal and 10,000 of his soldiers already within the city. Many of the Roman soldiers were asleep or drunk and were cut down by the Carthaginians as they stumbled out into the streets. Hannibal kept control of his troops to the extent that there was no general looting. Committed to respecting Tarentine freedom, Hannibal asked the Tarentines to mark houses where Tarentines lived. Only those houses not so marked and thus belonging to Romans were looted. Marcus Livius managed to bring his surviving troops to the citadel where they held off the Carthaginians for the duration of the war. However, the city was lost. All the Greek towns in Southern Italy with the exception of Rhegium were now under Hannibal's control.

Aftermath
Southern Italy provided Hannibal with a powerful foothold on the peninsula. However, when he heard news that the Romans were besieging Capua he turned his army around and only days after capturing Tarentum he was outside Capua. In the First Battle of Capua the besieging armies were temporarily driven off. At this point in history Hannibal looked invincible, having allies in southern Gaul, and owning Southern Italy and Iberia. Cities in Sicily such as Syracuse had revolted as well. Hannibal was also promised the support (which never came) of the powerful army of King Philip V of Macedon across the Adriatic. However, Hannibal's successes were not enduring. The Romans soon re-established their siege of Capua, and took the city following the Second Battle of Capua the next year. In 209 BC, Quintus Fabius Maximus Verrucosus recaptured Tarentum through treachery. In the following years, Scipio Africanus rose to prominence in Rome's military campaigns, and by copying Hannibal's tactics, eventually gained victory over Carthage.

See also

References

 The Punic Wars Later Campaigns

212 BC
Tarentum
Tarentum
Tarentum (212 BC)
History of Taranto
Ancient Apulia